The 1993 NCAA Division I Men's Soccer Tournament was the 34th organized men's college soccer tournament by the National Collegiate Athletic Association, to determine the top college soccer team in the United States. The Virginia Cavaliers won their fourth national title, and third straight, by defeating the South Carolina Gamecocks in the championship game, 2–0. The final match was played on December 5, 1993, in Davidson, North Carolina, at Richardson Stadium for the second straight year. All other games were played at the home field of the higher seeded team.

Early rounds

Final

See also  
 NCAA Division II Men's Soccer Championship
 NCAA Division III Men's Soccer Championship
 NAIA Men's Soccer Championship

References

NCAA Division I Men's Soccer Tournament seasons
NCAA Division I Men's Soccer Tournament
NCAA Division I Men's Soccer Tournament
NCAA Division I Men's Soccer Tournament